Attila Császári (born 1 January 1954) is a Hungarian former swimmer. He competed in two events at the 1972 Summer Olympics.

References

1954 births
Living people
Hungarian male swimmers
Olympic swimmers of Hungary
Swimmers at the 1972 Summer Olympics
Swimmers from Budapest